Anton Tus (born 22 November 1931) is a retired Croatian general who served as head of the Yugoslav Air Force between 1985 and 1991 and was the first Chief of Staff of the Croatian Armed Forces from 1991 to 1992 during the Croatian War of Independence.

Biography
A graduate of the Yugoslav Air Force Academy, Tus spent most of his career serving in the Yugoslav Air Force. From 1968 to 1969 he was commander of the 204th Fighter Aviation Regiment stationed at Batajnica Air Base. After that he was commander of the 5th Air Force and Air Defence Corps based in SR Croatia.

In 1985 he was promoted to the head of the Yugoslav Air Force and held that post until his defection in May 1991 amid the breakup of Yugoslavia. Between September 1991 and November 1992 he was the first Chief of the General Staff of the Croatian Armed Forces, succeeded in that post by general Janko Bobetko.

Between 1992 and 1995 he was president Franjo Tuđman's chief military advisor, before becoming head of Defence Ministry's Office for International Cooperation between 1995 and 2001. In 2001 he was appointed to the post of the chief of the Croatian Mission to NATO until retirement in 2005.

Honors
Grand Order of King Petar Krešimir IV
Order of Duke Domagoj
Order of Nikola Šubić Zrinski
Order of the Croatian Trefoil

References

External links
Anton Tus biography at Vojska.net 

1931 births
Croatian army officers
Military personnel of the Croatian War of Independence
Living people
Order of Duke Domagoj recipients
Order of Nikola Šubić Zrinski recipients
Generals of the Yugoslav People's Army
Central Committee of the League of Communists of Yugoslavia members